Lode Van Hecke OCSO (born 16 March 1950) is a Belgian Catholic prelate who serves as Bishop of Ghent. He was previously abbot of Orval Abbey from 2007 to November 2019. A monk since 1976, he is the only Trappist ever to be appointed bishop of a Belgian diocese.

Life
Van Hecke was born in Roeselare in West Flanders on 16 March 1950. After graduating from secondary school he spent a year at Bruges seminary and then studied philosophy at KU Leuven. He interrupted his studies for military service and became secretary to the head chaplain of the Belgian army. He returned to KU Leuven and earned his licenciate in philosophy with a dissertation on A. N. Whitehead. On 24 September 1976 he entered Orval Abbey and took his final vows as a Trappist on 6 March 1983. He obtained the degree of Licentiate of Sacred Theology from KU Leuven in 1988, with a thesis on Bernard of Clairvaux, and was ordained to the priesthood on 20 August 1995.

At Orval he served as novice master from 1990 to 1998, brewery director from 1998 to 2001, and prior and bursar from 2000 to 2002. He left the Abbey to work as secretary to the Abbot General of the Cistercians in Rome from 2002 to 2004. Returning to Orval, in 2005 he became guestmaster. He was elected Abbot of Orval on 25 January 2007 and installed on 2 June.

Pope Francis appointed him bishop of Ghent on 27 November 2019. He received his episcopal consecration from Jozef De Kesel, Archbishop of Mechelen-Brussels, on 23 February 2020 in a service attended by Queen Paola and representatives of the Muslim and Jewish communities; Trappist beer was served at the reception that followed.

Writings

References

1950 births
Living people
Belgian Cistercians
Belgian abbots
KU Leuven alumni
People from Roeselare
Trappists
Bishops appointed by Pope Francis
Trappist bishops